Rick and Morty – Lil' Poopy Superstar, known in languages other than English as Rick and Morty – The Adventures of Mr. Poopybutthole, is a limited series graphic novel, written and illustrated by Sarah Graley, and colored by Mildred Louis, and published in five parts in 2016 by Oni Press, as a spin-off of the company's first ongoing comic series based on the self-titled franchise by Justin Roiland and Dan Harmon. Part One was released on July 13; Part Two was released on September 8; Part Three was released on September 21; Part Four was released on October 19; and Part Five was released on November 16 (all in 2016). Each issue of the series contains a backup story entitled Meanwhile… (illustrated by Marc Ellerby), exploring the actions of other members of the Smith family over the course of Lil' Poopy Superstar. While intended to launch an ongoing series, subtitled "Volume 1" on publication of the collected volume, a second volume was ultimately cancelled, with "Part Five" marking the conclusion of the series.

The series is notable for exploring the origin story of Mr. Poopybutthole, a recurring supporting character and "long-time family friend" of the Smith family introduced in the second season episode "Total Rickall" of the Rick and Morty television series, and his post-recovery adventures with Summer Smith in-between the events of the episode and "The Wedding Squanchers", receiving a generally positive critical reception. In 2017, the series was nominated for the 2016 Licensed Comic of the Year and Best New Comic Book Series at the Diamond Gem Awards.

Overview
Sometime after the events of the Rick and Morty second season episode "Total Rickall", after recovering from being shot by Beth Smith (after she had mistaken him for a parasite), Mr. Poopybutthole recruits Beth's daughter Summer to assist him in reintegrating himself to the society of his home dimension, where-in he was the world's most-famous television and movie star, while also preparing Summer for her high school's first prom. Meanwhile…, the rest of the Smith family have a series of misadventures good and bad.

Premise

Part One
After recovering from being shot by Beth Smith in "Total Rickall", Mr. Poopybutthole is in trouble, and turns to the one person he can trust: Summer Smith! She's more than willing to help, but is he telling her the whole truth? Exploring his origin story, the two embark on their very own fantastic adventure across space, complete with jailbreaks, hijackings, and high school prom.

Meanwhile…, Rick Sanchez helps Morty Smith with a test.

Part Two
Mr. Poopybutthole (PB) lets Summer in on an industry secret: that being a huge television and movie star isn't what it's cracked up to be! He should know after all, seeing as he was this dimension's biggest "Lil' Poopy Superstar" until he mysteriously went missing, running away to Earth! Together Summer and Mr. Poopybutthole must work together to avoid the latter's savage fans, sneak into buildings undetected, and get back onto the big screen.

Meanwhile…, Rick Sanchez and Jerry Smith go on a pleasant inter-dimensional road trip together!

Part Three
Things take a turn for the worse when Summer and Mr. Poopybutthole get split up and Summer ends up in space jail! What's even up with space jail? What would Mr. Poopybutthole do? All we know is that Summer must break out! Armed only with a portal gun on low battery and Mr. Poopybutthole's bowler hat, she must come up with a plan – and without a moment to spare! She can't miss the school prom on Friday, after all.

Meanwhile…, Beth Smith rescues her husband Jerry from a monster searching for Rick in a shopping mall.

Part Four
Mr. Poopybutthole (PB) is up to his top hat in trouble! Kidnapped and tied to a chair, PB must negotiate with his crooked agent Cecelia! Otherwise he'll get forced into a contract of being a glamorous tv/movie star again, oOOo-wee, no thank you. It seems only Summer can save him now, but will she get to Mr. Poopybutthole in time before he is whisked away and put on a film set?

Meanwhile… at home, Rick reveals Jerry's tasty secret: making cupcakes with his family's faces decorated on them at his night school baking class.

Part Five
It's finally the most anticipated event of the year, Prom! Mr. Poopybutthole and Summer are all dressed up and ready to unwind after a stressful adventure, but when some uninvited guests crash the party, they make it a night Summer and Mr. Poopybutthole will never forget.

Meanwhile… in an alternate ending, in Dimension S-223, will Rick finally be rewarded what is rightfully his – this year's Prom King crown and sash?

Development
In February 2017, Mildred Louis described her work on colouring Sarah Graley's art on Lil' Poopy Superstar as doing "a really great job of capturing a lot of the punch from the "Rick and Morty" cartoon while still maintaining a good amount of influence from their own work", while having "a really nice playful quality to it". Graley herself further revealed that she was initially approached by Oni Press editor Ari Yarwood (who described the series as "charming and fun"), to pitch a standalone issue of the first (2015–2020) Rick and Morty ongoing comic book series, which ultimately turned into an order for a five-issue spin-off miniseries, with the potential to become an ongoing series itself. Describing Rick and Morty as having been one of her favourite cartoons, and working on the series as feeling like "writing/drawing fan fiction but as my job". Asked on the process of "taking a one-off (and more or less undefined character) and turning him into the focal point of a story", Graley elaborated that it "gave [her] a lot of creative freedom [and that] I started brainstorming ideas [when] I realized I could really dig into this and get creative", defining Summer Smith as "quick witted, [one who] takes control and doesn't take any BS" and Mr. Poopybutthole as "eccentric and maybe a loose cannon?", with both having "good intentions and strong moral compasses, which lead them on this adventure to right a wrong in Mr. Poopybutthole's mysterious past".

On developing her own artistic style for the series, Graley stated that she wanted the comic to "still reflect the show artistically [while allowing her] own style to be present", citing a love for picking up comics where "the style breaks the mould and reflects the particular artist's own personal touch", specifically citing issues of the mainline series  by Zac Gorman and Kyle Starks. On writing Mr. Poopybutthole's dialogue and its "rhythm", Graley described it as "a little weird to start with, as there wasn't much dialogue as reference to work from! Mr. Poopybutthole has such unique vocabulary though, so what I had to work with was plenty in regards to getting the voice right in the comic. "Ooo-wees" totally snuck into my own vocabulary for a little while, though. I bet I was a total treat to hang out with because of that." Graley described the various backup stories as "little peeks into what the rest of the Smith family were up to while Summer and Mr. Poopybutthole were off adventuring [and] super fun to play around with the other characters", in particular her "favorite character" Jerry Smith, before concluding the overall process to have been "a total blast".

The series' variant covers were illustrated by Megan Levens, Cat Farris, Sara Richard, Katy Farina, Alice Meichi Li, Molly Ostertag, Emilee Denich, and Julieta Colás. In a separate interview in April 2017, responding to Katy Farina's statement of writing the series allowing "a lot of freedom to experiment with colors and light sources in all these alien worlds, so I get to mess around a bunch", Sarah Graley further described the writing of Lil' Poopy Superstar in allowing "playing around with other people's characters [as] pretty amazing [and drawing] artwork that would later be coloured by Mildred Louis [as] a really cool part of working on "Lil' Poopy Superstar," because she's always knocking it outta the park", concluding that it was "exciting working on a team, submitting all your parts separately and then later seeing everything finished, coming together to form each awesome issue".

Reception

David Brooke of AIPT Comics lauded Sarah Graley's writing and illustrations as "bringing a unique art style that’s reminiscent of Bryan Lee O'Malley [and] a lot of [the same] energy [as] her series Pizza Witch, which a series like this needs", describing the series' antagonists as "some kind of amalgam of Sesame Street and Meatball from Aqua Teen Hunger Force", before concluding to compliment the "special effects around [the title character that] add a bit of oomph to the character" and describe the series as "a must read for die hard Rick and Morty fans". Denis Varkov of Kanobu complimented Lil' Poopy Superstar as the first mini-series in the franchise, as a "simple as possible [story] worth paying attention to". while Paul Mirek of Broken Frontier simply summed up the series as "unsummarizable".

Comic Bastards praised the "quirkiness" as strong, embracing the "crazy, sci-fi parody goodness" of the franchise, noting that "this comic [seems to be] made for existing fans of the show, but it would be better if this comic was accessible to those who aren't already familiar with the source material[…] satirical and even thought provoking at times, despite all its obvious, wacky craziness". The Bookish Kirra complimented Sarah Graley's illustrations as "pretty great with the same look of the show but with a rounder and quicker drawing style [with] a lot of effort put into the drawing [in] depth and detailed background settings", and her writing as "very similar to the show [with] a good amount of [it] to keep the story flowing quickly", while Adam Frey of Pop Culture Uncovered praised Graley's "hyperbolic take on the characters", criticising her art as "neither replicating the show’s distinct style nor making its own unique take on the characters".

In 2017, the series was nominated for the 2016 Licensed Comic of the Year and Best New Comic Book Series at the Diamond Gem Awards.

Collected editions

References

External links
 Rick and Morty – Lil' Poopy Superstar at Oni Press

2016 graphic novels
Superstar, Lil' Poopy
Oni Press titles
Prequel comics
Sequel comics